This is a list of the main career statistics of tennis player Milos Raonic.

Grand Slam finals

Singles: 1 (1 runner-up)

Other significant finals

Masters 1000 finals

Singles: 4 (4 runner-ups)

ATP career finals

Singles: 23 (8 titles, 15 runner-ups)

Doubles: 1 (1 runner-up)

Singles performance timeline

Current through the 2021 Atlanta Open.

ATP Challenger and ITF Futures finals

Singles: 8 (4–4)

Doubles: 9 (6–3)

Record against other players

Head-to-head against career-high top-20 players
The table below chronicles Raonic's head-to-head record against all players who have a career-high singles ranking of 20 or better. Active players are highlighted in bold.

|-bgcolor=efefef class=sortbottom
|align=left colspan=10|Number 1 ranked players
|-

|-bgcolor=efefef class=sortbottom
|align=left colspan=10|Number 2 ranked players
|-

|-bgcolor=efefef class=sortbottom
|align=left colspan=10|Number 3 ranked players
|-

|-bgcolor=efefef class=sortbottom
|align=left colspan=10|Number 13 ranked players
|-

|-bgcolor=efefef class=sortbottom
|align=left colspan=10|Number 14 ranked players
|-

|-bgcolor=efefef class=sortbottom
|align=left colspan=10|Number 15 ranked players
|-

|-bgcolor=efefef class=sortbottom
|align=left colspan=10|Number 16 ranked players
|-

|-bgcolor=efefef class=sortbottom
|align=left colspan=10|Number 17 ranked players
|-

|-bgcolor=efefef class=sortbottom
|align=left colspan=10|Number 18 ranked players
|-

|-bgcolor=efefef class=sortbottom
|align=left colspan=10|Number 19 ranked players
|-

|-bgcolor=efefef class=sortbottom
|align=left colspan=10|Number 20 ranked players
|-

Wins over top-10 opponents
Raonic has a  record against players who were, at the time the match was played, ranked in the top 10. He has registered top 10 victories in consecutive matches during four tournaments: 2012 Chennai Open, 2012 Japan Open, 2013 Thailand Open, and 2014 Paris Masters. He has also registered top 10 wins in consecutive matches once spanning two tournaments;he beat Fernando Verdasco in the final of the 2011 Pacific Coast Championships and again in the first match of the U.S. National Indoor Tennis Championships the following week.

*

Grand Slam seedings

*

National representation

Davis Cup (18–6)
Overall, Raonic has 18 match wins in 24 Davis Cup matches (16–5 in singles;2–1 in doubles). He is one of the most successful players in Canadian Davis Cup history, tied for the six most match wins overall and tied for third in singles match wins.

Olympics (1–1)
In the second round of the singles competition at the London 2012 Olympics, Raonic lost to French player Jo-Wilfried Tsonga 3–6, 6–3, 23–25, breaking three Olympic tennis records. The match holds the records for the most games played in a best-of-three sets match (66 games) and the most games played in a single set (48 games) in Olympic history. At the time, it was the longest Olympic match by time played (3 hours 57 minutes), but this record was broken three days later in the semifinal match between Roger Federer and Juan Martin del Potro (4 hours 26 minutes).

Service and return statistics
The tables below summarize the performance and ATP ranking of Raonic in several service and return metrics.

* Statistics correct .

Coaches
Raonic has had 15 coaches. Of these, twelve played professional tennis before coaching (Guillaume Marx, Frédéric Niemeyer, Galo Blanco, Ivan Ljubičić, Carlos Moyá, John McEnroe, Richard Krajicek, Mark Knowles, Dušan Vemić Goran Ivanišević, Fabrice Santoro and Mario Tudor) while three are career coaches (Casey Curtis, Riccardo Piatti and Javier Piles). 
2

Career prize money
This table summarizes the career prize money earned by Raonic at ITF Futures, ATP Challenger Tour, ATP World Tour, and Grand Slam tournaments. It does not include money earned from endorsements, appearance fees, or other sources.

* Statistics correct .

References

External links

Tennis career statistics